Yuri Morales (born September 30, 1981 in San Juan, Puerto Rico) is a Puerto Rican footballer who plays for the United States national beach soccer team.

Morales played previously with the Danish professional football club Viborg FF. He also played for Ølstykke FC, Puerto Rico Islanders, Portland Timbers and California Victory. During the 2010 season, Morales played with Beach Soccer Team Zurich where he was the Swiss Beach Soccer League top scorer (35 goals) and league MVP.

His family moved to Santa Cruz, California when Yuri was just eighteen months old. He is the son of Puerto Rican Raul Morales and Helen Nunberg.

References

External links
 Official Site
 U-Mass Profiles

1981 births
Living people
Sportspeople from San Juan, Puerto Rico
Puerto Rican footballers
USL First Division players
California Victory players
Ølstykke FC players
Portland Timbers (2001–2010) players
Puerto Rico Islanders players
Viborg FF players
Association football forwards
American beach soccer players